The Ponda Fort is located near Ponda, in the state of Goa on the west coast of India. The present structure is a modern reconstruction on this location and converted into a park. In 2017 the lower walls of the fort had collapsed, due to neglect and also due to the use of poor quality materials during a previous (1977) renovation. The original structure was constructed of stone and mud, and left bare, the new structure contains stone, concrete and is plastered and painted red.

History

Muslim Era
In the early 16th century, the region around Ponda was ruled by the Adil Shahi Kingdom. They wanted a defense against the ever-expanding Portuguese Empire to the west, and had built a fortification on a hillside at Farmagudi. In 1665 AD, a Maratha rebel leader within Bijapur - Shivaji, led a failed raid on the fort. The Sultan's forces due to their recent skirmishes with the Portuguese were weakened and the fort was badly damaged due to the artillery bombardment. Shivaji tried again, this time successfully, to capture the fort on later conquest in 1675.

Maratha Era
After Shivaji's death, his son Sambhaji took a strong control over the Maratha Kingdom. In 1683, he launched a surprise attack on the Konkan territories of Portugal. To avoid unnecessary bloodshed, the Portuguese offered to pay off the local Maratha governor named Naik to take control over Ponda Fort. This peace offer was refused, since Naik was expecting the arrival of Sambaji's reinforcements from Rajapur. He had, along with him an army of 11,000 infantry and 6,000 cavalry. The Portuguese Viceroy, Francisco de Tavora de Conde de Alvor led an artillery attack on the fort to weaken it. In this battle, Ponda Fort was badly damaged and led to high Maratha casualties, but the fort stayed in Maratha hands. The war ended with a general retreat of the Maratha forces from Portuguese territories.
After Sambhaji's execution at Tulapur in 1689, the Peshwas gained control over the Maratha Empire which also included Ponda Fort.

Portuguese Era
In 1783, the fort, along with the rest of the Novas Conquistas regions was ceded to the Portuguese by the Maratha Kingdom of Savantvadi under Ramachandra Savant I Bhonsle, as they needed assistance against their rival Sambhaji II of the Kingdom of Kolhapur. It stayed under Portuguese control for more than 175 years until the Invasion of Goa by India. During this time, it fell into disuse and crumbled off due to neglect, as there was no hostile forces left, to defend against.

Indian Era
The Indian government took control of the fort after 1961, and renovated it into a park in 1977. During this time, a statue of Shivaji was erected by Shashikala Kakodkar of the pro-Marathi Maharashtrawadi Gomantak Party.

References

External links

 Shivaji Fort, Ponda by IndiaVideodotOrg

Forts in Goa
Colonial Goa
Maratha Empire
Adil Shahi dynasty
Shivaji
16th-century fortifications
Ruins